Irish round towers ( (singular),  (plural); literally 'bell house') are early mediaeval stone towers of a type found mainly in Ireland, with two in Scotland and one on the Isle of Man. As their name  indicates, they were originally bell towers, though they may have been later used for additional purposes.

A tower of this kind is generally found in the vicinity of a church or monastery, with the door of the tower facing the west doorway of the church. Knowledge of this fact has made it possible, where towers still exist, to determine without excavation the approximate sites of lost churches that once stood nearby.

Construction and distribution
The masonry differs according to date, the earliest examples being uncut rubble, while the later ones are of neatly joined stonework (ashlar). The lower portion is solid masonry with a single door raised two to three metres above, often accessible only by a ladder. Within, in some, are two or more floors (or signs of where such floors existed), usually of wood, and it is thought that there were ladders in between. The windows, which are high up, are slits in the stone. The cap (roof), is of stone, usually conical in shape, although some of the towers are now crowned by a later circle of battlements.

The main reason for the entrance-way being built above ground level was to maintain the structural integrity of the building rather than for defence. The towers were generally built with very little foundation. The tower at Monasterboice has an underground foundation of only sixty centimetres. Building the door at ground level would weaken the tower. The buildings still stand today because their round shape is gale-resistant and the section of the tower underneath the entrance is packed with soil and stones.

The distance from the ground to the raised doorway is somewhat greater than that from the first floor to the second; thus large, rigid steps would be too large for the door.  Excavations in the 1990s, revealing postholes, confirm that wooden steps were built.  However, the use of ladders prior to the construction of such steps 
cannot be ruled out.

The towers were probably built between the 9th and 12th centuries. In Ireland about 120 examples are thought once to have existed; most are in ruins, while eighteen to twenty are almost perfect. There are three examples outside Ireland. Two are in eastern Scotland: the Brechin Round Tower and the Abernethy Round Tower, and the other is in Peel Castle on St. Patrick's Isle, now linked to the Isle of Man.

Famous examples are to be found at Devenish Island, and Glendalough, while that at Clondalkin is the only Round Tower in Ireland to still retain its original cap. With five towers each, County Mayo, County Kilkenny and County Kildare have the most. The only known round tower with a hexagonal base is at Kinneigh in County Cork, built in 1014. The round tower at Ardmore, County Waterford, believed to be the latest built in Ireland (c. 12th century), has the unique feature of three string courses around the exterior.

Purpose

It is likely that the primary reason for the round tower was—as the name cloigtheach indicates—to act as a belfry. The Irish word for round tower, cloigtheach, literally meaning bellhouse indicates this, as noted by George Petrie in 1845. The Irish language has greatly evolved over the last millennium. Dinneen notes the alternate pronunciations, cluiceach and cuilceach for cloigtheach. The closely pronounced cloichtheach means stone-house or stone-building. The round tower seems to be the only significant stone building in Ireland before the advent of the Normans in 1169–1171 CE.

UCD Professor of Archaeology Tadhg O'Keeffe has suggested that the towers were originally high-status royal chapels, citing how two of them (Kells and Duleek) were scenes of regicide. He also suggested that the windows were arranged clockwise to imitate the order of relic-carrying procession from the elevated door to the very top.

Another possible purpose would be for taking shelter during raids.  The mostly enclosed top floors and stone rooftops would make for terrible belltowers.  The elevated doorway could have had a ladder that would be drawn up during raids, and the thick stone walls could withstand most attacks.  Since the doors always face where a church stood, this also adds weight to the theory they were where monks would evacuate to.

Modern symbolic towers

In Ireland
Daniel O'Connell's tomb at Glasnevin Cemetery in Dublin had a round tower built above it after his burial in 1847.

At what is now the Irish National Heritage Park at Ferrycarrig in County Wexford, there is a 19th-century copy of a round tower. It was erected to the memory of the Wexford men who fell in the Crimean War.

At St. Ita's Hospital in Portrane, County Dublin, there is a replica round tower built in 1844 as a memorial to George Hampden Evans by his wife.

In the Knockmealdown Mountains in County Waterford is another memorial in the form of an 18m high round tower. It was erected in 1935 on the spot where Liam Lynch, military leader of the anti-treaty Irish Republican Army during the Irish Civil War is thought to have fallen in 1923.

The Ulster History Park in County Tyrone has a replica of a round tower.

St Patrick's Church of Ireland church in Saul, County Down has a round tower, built in 1933.

The Chaine Memorial Tower in Larne County Antrim is a lighthouse done in the style of a round tower. It was built to commemorate James Chaine, a former MP for Antrim.

Outside Ireland

Another "revival" round tower was built in 1997 in the Island of Ireland Peace Park in Belgium, as a war memorial to the soldiers of the island of Ireland who died, were wounded or are missing from World War I. The  tower is in the traditional design of an Irish round tower and is partially built with stone from a former army barracks in Tipperary.

At Saint Mary's Cemetery in Milford, Massachusetts a round tower was built of Milford granite in the late 19th century as a memorial to central Massachusetts' Irish immigrants, of whom thousands are buried there.
In 2003 Tony Ryan, a native of Thurles, County Tipperary, built a round tower at his Castleton Lyons Stud in Kentucky.

The second church to be built on the site of St John the Evangelist Catholic Church in East Melbourne, Victoria, Australia, completed in December 1900, features a 13-metre Irish round tower on its eastern side.  The tower is based on the entrance to King Cormac's Chapel on the Rock of Cashel in Tipperary, built in 1137.  The structure is now part of the Catholic Leadership Centre, operated by the Catholic Education Office Melbourne.

List of Irish round towers

The following is a list of surviving Irish round towers, excluding modern reconstructions.

Source: roundtowers.org

List of missing towers

This is a list of Irish round towers known to have existed, but no trace now remains.

See also
Broch
Chaine Memorial, a relatively modern tower lighthouse at Larne, in the style of a round tower.
Pele tower
Rock of Cashel

References

Sources

External links

Irish Round Towers — detailed photographic archive and information for fifty-two Irish round towers.

Kinneigh Round Tower — articles and photos about Kinneigh Round Tower

Archaeology of Ireland
Buildings and structures in Ireland
Towers in Ireland
Christian bell towers
!